Gorman John Heimueller (born September 24, 1955) is a former Major League Baseball pitcher.

Sources
, or Retrosheet, or Pura Pelota

1955 births
Living people
Baseball players from Los Angeles
Cal Poly Mustangs baseball players
California Polytechnic State University alumni
Cedar Rapids Giants players
Major League Baseball pitchers
Minor league baseball coaches
Oakland Athletics players
Orlando Twins players
Shreveport Captains players
Tacoma Tigers players
Tiburones de La Guaira players
American expatriate baseball players in Venezuela
Tigres de Aragua players
Toledo Mud Hens players
Waterbury Giants players
West Haven A's players